is a Japanese football player playing for J3 League team FC Gifu .

Club career
After graduating from Hosei University he joined S-Pulse in 2008.

National team career
In August 2008, Honda was elected Japan U-23 national team for 2008 Summer Olympics. At this tournament, he played 2 matches as defensive midfielder.

Club statistics
Updated to end of 2018 season.

National team statistics

References

External links
 
 
 Japan National Football Team Database
 
 
 Profile at Montedio Yamagata

1985 births
Living people
Hosei University alumni
Association football people from Kanagawa Prefecture
Japanese footballers
Japan international footballers
J1 League players
J2 League players
FC Gifu players
Shimizu S-Pulse players
Kashima Antlers players
Montedio Yamagata players
Olympic footballers of Japan
Footballers at the 2008 Summer Olympics
2011 AFC Asian Cup players
AFC Asian Cup-winning players
Footballers at the 2006 Asian Games
Association football midfielders
Asian Games competitors for Japan